The ARM Cortex-A710 is the successor to the ARM Cortex-A78, being the First-Generation Armv9 “big” Cortex CPU. It is the companion to the ARM Cortex-A510 "LITTLE" efficiency core. It was designed by ARM Ltd.'s Austin centre. It  is the fourth and last iteration of Arm’s Austin core family.

Design
 10-cycle pipeline
 The only ARMv9 to support EL0 AArch32

Improvements:
 30% more power efficient than Cortex-A78.
 10% uplift in performance compared to Cortex-A78
2x ML uplift

Usage 

 MediaTek Dimensity 9000/9000+
 Qualcomm Snapdragon 7 Gen 1
 Qualcomm Snapdragon 7+ Gen 2
 Qualcomm Snapdragon 8/8+ Gen 1
 Samsung Exynos 2200

References

ARM processors